Bal-ri is an administrative division, or village, located in Onyang, Ulju County, Ulsan, South Korea. It is located east of Daean-ri, just south of Dongsang-ri.

See also
South Korea portal

References

External links 
 Onyang town official web site 

Ulju County
Villages in South Korea